Bill Long (January 2, 1917 – July 24, 2006) was a Canadian ice hockey coach. He was born in Barrie, Ontario.

Long spent three decades coaching in the Ontario Hockey League with the Niagara Falls Flyers, London Knights and Ottawa 67's. He played with the Pittsburgh Hornets of the IAHL in the 1939-40 season. The OHL created the Bill Long Award in his honour, for distinguished lifetime service to the league. He won the Memorial Cup with the Flyers in 1965. Long was awarded the Matt Leyden Trophy as Coach of the Year in 1976-77. He died in London, Ontario, in 2006 after suffering from Alzheimer's disease later in life.

External links 

PittsburghHockey.net

1917 births
2006 deaths
Neurological disease deaths in Ontario
Deaths from Alzheimer's disease
London Knights coaches
Ottawa 67's coaches
Ice hockey people from Simcoe County
Sportspeople from Barrie